Manthri Kochamma is a 1998 Indian Malayalam film, directed by Rajan Sithara. Produced by Azeez Parappanangadi  The film stars Prem Kumar, Indrans, Kalpana, Mala Aravindan and Kanaka in the lead roles. The film has musical score by Mohan Sithara.

Cast
 
Prem Kumar as Jayan
Kanaka as  Maya
Jagathy Sreekumar 
Indrans 
Kalpana 
Mala Aravindan 
Salim Kumar 
Vijayaraghavan as Krishna Prasad / Tony
Baiju Ezhupunna as Maheswari Warrier's Brother in law
Kumarakam Raghunath as Maheswari Warrier's Brother in law
Chithra as Dr. Maheswari Warrier
 Lakshmi Marikar as Neethu / Meenu (Twins)

Soundtrack
The music was composed by Mohan Sithara.

References

External links
 

1998 films
1990s Malayalam-language films
Films scored by Mohan Sithara